The Third Choice: Islam, Dhimmitude and Freedom is a book written by Mark Durie, with a Foreword by Bat Ye'or. It deals with the status of non-Muslim populations (the dhimmis) after the conquest of their lands by Muslims. The Third Choice was short-listed for Australian Christian Book of the Year, 2010.

Quote from the author
The author claims that: "One of the most profound and least-understood manifestations of rejection in human history is the Islamic institution of the dhimma, the theologically-driven political, social, and legal system, imposed by Islamic law upon non-Muslims as an alternative to Islam (i.e. conversion) or the sword (i.e. death or captivity). The dhimma is the ‘third choice’ offered to non-Muslims under jihad conditions, and those who have accepted it are known as dhimmis. Their condition, dhimmitude, forms the subject of this book, which describes the challenge posed by Islam's treatment of non-Muslims, exposes the spiritual roots of this challenge, and offers a solution..."

Commentary and criticism
According to the book review by Mervyn Bendle from James Cook University, Durie contends that instead of a "hardening of resolve", Western attitudes in the aftermath of the 9/11 attacks consisted of "widespread capitulation to Muslim demands" to the detriment of public policy, human rights, and free speech. Among other things, Durie cites various statements praising Islam by politicians such as Barack Obama, Nicolas Sarkozy and Mary Robinson; statements by Western politicians in support of Sharia law; and other statements of "humility" by Christian leaders as evidence of dhimmitude.

Adam A.J. DeVille from University of St. Francis describes the book as mix of scholarly and high journalism work. According to DeVille the book does not provide enough evidence to substantiate the claims it makes, and this may be due to the fact that Mark Durie is not an academic. He finds Durie "writes more cogently and dispassionately than" Bat Ye’or.

See also

 Jizya
 Millet (Ottoman Empire)

References

2010 non-fiction books
2010 in Islam
History books about Islam
Islam and other religions
Persecution by Muslims
Religion and politics
Eurabia